Spirits is the sixth studio album by American rock band Nothing More, released on October 14, 2022.

Background and recording
After the release of their fifth studio album, The Stories We Tell Ourselves (2017), Nothing More toured extensively in support of the album. Planning for a follow-up album started as early as January 2019, with frontman Jonny Hawkins that he was working on prepping a new studio to prepare for new album sessions between legs of touring. Hawkins noted it was difficult at times focusing on touring when he had so many thoughts on creating a new album. By October, guitarist Mark Vollelunga noted that the band had been creating makeshift recording areas in locker rooms and dressing rooms so they could hold impromptu jam sessions of new material prior to performing their lives shows. He noted that the band would change gears and focus 100% on writing and recording a new album in 2020.

Serious work on the album began in 2020, right about the same time that the COVID-19 pandemic broke out. At first, the band appreciated the forced break in touring to focus on the album, but over time, band members felt it drew out the process unnecessarily; without hard time frames to work with, recording sessions dragged on longer and the band struggled to complete the album. Having to record the album remotely due to COVID-19 restrictions also slowed down the process—by almost a year according to Hawkins. In recording prior albums, the band had only worked remotely to a minimal degree, usually just sending each other song ideas and keeping progress moving while they could not be together; this was the first time they had recorded an entire album in that fashion.

Themes and composition
In 2019, in early planning sessions, Hawkins noted his plans for the album revolved around a lot of personal subject matter he was experiencing at the time:
"I've experienced a lot of emotions that I've never really experienced before in my life, and a lot of that is a result of moving to a different state that I've never lived in before. I'm leaving a lot of my family and friends eight hours away. It's being on a totally new terrain with my girlfriend, uncharted territory relationship wise, learning a lot about myself, so I've been experiencing a lot of emotions, positive and negative that I've been trying to dig into and navigate. I've also been doing counseling sessions with a counselor that I've trusted for the last few years who has been really insightful and sometimes a mystical mirror for me. He has brought a lot of interesting ideas to my mind when I open up and unload a lot of the thoughts that I'm having. That's been inspiring a lot of song ideas. In 2022, Hawkins described it as "a lot of heavier songs and more aggressive than we've ever done in the past. It's very dense, there's a lot of layers on this album, there's a lot of movements". Undisclosed emergencies where band members' lives were in danger across 2020 and 2021 also helped shaped the album's themes, and the track "Valhalla" touches on what can be learned from those sorts of scenarios. On a whole, the album explores how the "beast side" of humanity can be redirected towards being a "protector rather than being a tyrant". The track "Tired of Winning", according to Hawkins, is about the negative aspects of never being happy or satisfied with one's life. "Turn it Up (Stand in the Fire) was described by the band as "unapologetic sonic rejection of the divisive, digitally drowned state of the world."

Release and promotion
The album was released on October 14, 2022. An accompanying graphic novel themed around the album, titled Spirits Vol. 1, is scheduled for release sometime in early 2023. Two formal singles have been released to promote the album ahead of release, "Tired of Winning" on April 28, and "You Don't Know What Love Means" on August 13. Additionally, promotional song "Turn It Up Like (Stand in the Fire)" was released on March 22, 2022, with a music video releasing the following week. An extended version of "Tired of Winning" that merged the next track, "Ships in the Night", into the end of it, was released on July 29. The extended version of the song also appeared on the soundtrack for the September 2022 film The Retaliators.

Track list

Personnel
Nothing More
 Jonny Hawkins – lead vocals
 Mark Vollelunga – guitar, backing vocals
 Daniel Oliver – bass, keyboards, backing vocals
 Ben Anderson – drums

Charts

References

2022 albums
Eleven Seven Label Group albums
Nothing More albums